The standard atmosphere (symbol: atm) is a unit of pressure defined as  Pa. It is sometimes used as a reference pressure or standard pressure. It is approximately equal to Earth's average atmospheric pressure at sea level.

History
It was used as a reference condition for physical and chemical properties, and was implicit in the definition of the Celsius temperature scale, which defined  as the boiling point of water at this pressure. In 1954, the 10th General Conference on Weights and Measures (CGPM) adopted standard atmosphere for general use and affirmed its definition of being precisely equal to  dynes per square centimetre. This defined both temperature and pressure independent of the properties of particular substance. In addition, the CGPM noted that there had been some misapprehension that it "led some physicists to believe that this definition of the standard atmosphere was valid only for accurate work in thermometry."

In chemistry and in various industries, the reference pressure referred to in standard temperature and pressure was commonly  but standards have since diverged; in 1982, the International Union of Pure and Applied Chemistry recommended that for the purposes of specifying the physical properties of substances, standard pressure should be precisely .

Pressure units and equivalencies 

A pressure of 1 atm can also be stated as:

≡  pascals (Pa)
≡  bar
≈  kgf/cm2
≈  technical atmosphere
≈  m H2O, 4 °C

≈  mmHg, 0 °C, subject to revision as more precise measurements of mercury's density become available
≡  torr (Torr)
≈  inHg, 0 °C, subject to revision as more precise measurements of mercury's density become available

≈  in H2O, 4 °C
≈  pounds-force per square inch (lbf/in2)
≈  pounds-force per square foot (lbf/ft2)
= 1 ata (atmosphere absolute). 

The ata unit is used in place of atm to indicate the total pressure of the system, compared to a vacuum. For example, an underwater pressure of 3 ata would mean that this pressure includes 1 atm of air pressure and thus 2 atm due to the water.

Notes

See also

Standard temperature and pressure
Atmospheric pressure
International Standard Atmosphere

References 

Units of pressure
Atmosphere